The 2022 FIBA 3x3 Europe Cup was the seventh edition of the 3x3 Europe Cup that featured separate competitions for men's and women's national teams. It was held between 9 and 11 September 2022 in Graz, Austria.

Serbia's men team won its fourth consecutive title, while France's women team won its third title.

Medalists

Men's tournament

Preliminary round
Pool A

Pool B

Pool C

Pool D

Knockout stage 
All times are local.

Final standings

Women's tournament

Preliminary round
Pool A

Pool B

Pool C

Pool D

Knockout stage 
All times are local.

Final standings

References

2022
2022 in 3x3 basketball
2022 in Austrian sport
2022 in European sport
2022